The Shawinigan Cataractes are a junior ice hockey team in the Quebec Major Junior Hockey League. The team is based in Shawinigan, Quebec, Canada. The Cataractes have been previously known as the Shawinigan Bruins until 1973, and were called the Shawinigan Dynamos from 1973 to 1978.

The Cataractes play their home games at the Centre Gervais Auto. The former home of the team was Aréna Jacques Plante. Over the course of their 43-year history, they did not win any League championships or Memorial Cups until they were chosen to host the 2012 Memorial Cup tournament, as they became only the second team to play in the tie-breaker and win in overtime in front of a sellout hometown crowd.

Etymology
"Cataractes" is the plural form of "cataracte", which means in English 'cataract' in the sense of a powerful waterfall, derived from the Latin word "cataracta" meaning 'waterfall' or 'portcullis'. The team is named after the Shawinigan Falls, a prominent waterfall in the city of Shawinigan.

NHL alumni

Yves Beaudoin
Anthony Beauvillier
Jean-Claude Bergeron
Marc-André Bergeron
Yves Bergeron
Alexandre Bolduc
Michaël Bournival
Mathieu Biron
Michel Brière
Alexandre Burrows
Stéphane Charbonneau
Mathieu Chouinard
Enrico Ciccone
Matthieu Descoteaux
Samuel Girard
Benoit Gosselin
Mario Gosselin
François Groleau
Stéphane Guérard
Jean-François Jomphe
Patrick Lalime
Patrick Lebeau
Stéphan Lebeau
Patrice Lefebvre
Zbynek Michalek
Olivier Michaud
Sergio Momesso
Stéphane Morin
Paul Pageau
Steve Penney
Timo Pielmeier
Jason Pominville
Daniel Poudrier
Claude Pronovost
Jean-François Quintin
Pierre Rioux
Stéphane Robidas
Dominic Roussel
Daniel Shank
Patrick Traverse
Radim Vrbata

Season results
1969–73 Shawinigan Bruins
1973–78 Shawinigan Dynamos
1978–present Shawinigan Cataractes

Legend: OTL = Overtime loss, SL = Shootout loss

†Seeded 8th in Eastern Division for 2006–07 playoffs.

††Seeded 5th in Telus Division for 2008–09 playoffs.

External links
 Official Site

Quebec Major Junior Hockey League teams
Ice hockey teams in Quebec
Shawinigan
Ice hockey clubs established in 1969
1969 establishments in Quebec